Chloroselas minima, the tiny gem, is a butterfly in the family Lycaenidae. It is found in central Kenya and along the coast and along the northern coast of Tanzania. The habitat consists of arid savanna.

Adults have been recorded feeding from flowers in open grassland.

References

Butterflies described in 1966
Chloroselas